Charles Cornwallis, 4th Baron Cornwallis  (167520 January 1721/22) was a British politician.

Background
He was the son of Charles Cornwallis, 3rd Baron Cornwallis (c. 1655 – 1693) and Elizabeth Fox (c. 1654 – 1680/81). On 29 April 1693 he succeeded his father as Baron Cornwallis.

Political career
His grandfather was Charles Cornwallis, 2nd Baron Cornwallis, who was the MP for Eye (1660-1662).  Between 1695 and 1698, he sat as Member of Parliament for  Eye, as a Whig. He held the office of Lord-Lieutenant of Suffolk between 1698 and 1703, and the office of Joint Postmaster-General between 1715 and 1721. The last two years of his life, from 1721 to January 1721/22 he held the office of Paymaster of the Forces in the Cabinet of Walpole and Townshend.

Family
A grandson of Charles Cornwallis, 2nd Baron Cornwallis, he married Lady Charlotte Butler, daughter of Richard Butler, 1st Earl of Arran, on 6 June 1699. They had 10 children:

 Charles
 Stephen
 Charlotte (1704–?)
 John (1705–1768)
 Richard (1708–1741)
 Elizabeth (1709–?)
 Mary (1711–?)
 Edward and Frederick
 Henry (1715–?)

He was the grandfather of Charles, William, and James Cornwallis; the great-grandfather of Charles Cornwallis; the 2nd great-grandfather of James Mann; the 3rd great-grandfather of Fiennes Cornwallis; the 4th great-grandfather of Fiennes Cornwallis, 1st Baron Cornwallis; the 5th great-grandfather of Wykeham Cornwallis, 2nd Baron Cornwallis; and the 6th great-grandfather of Fiennes Cornwallis, 3rd Baron Cornwallis.

Ancestry

References

Bibliography

1675 births
1722 deaths
17th-century English nobility
18th-century English nobility
Lord-Lieutenants of Suffolk
Members of the Privy Council of Great Britain
Paymasters of the Forces
United Kingdom Postmasters General
Charles
Barons Cornwallis
Whig (British political party) MPs for English constituencies